Arsenal Football Club is an English professional association football club based in Islington, London. The club was formed in Woolwich in 1886 as Dial Square before being renamed as Royal Arsenal, and then Woolwich Arsenal in 1893. In 1914, the club's name was shortened to Arsenal F.C. after moving to Highbury a year earlier. After spending their first four seasons solely participating in cup tournaments and friendlies, Arsenal became the first southern member admitted into the Football League in 1893. In spite of finishing fifth in the Second Division in 1919, the club was voted to rejoin the First Division at the expense of local rivals Tottenham Hotspur. Since that time, they have not fallen below the first tier of the English football league system and hold the record for the longest uninterrupted period in the top flight. The club remained in the Football League until 1992, when its First Division was superseded as English football's top level by the newly formed Premier League, of which they were an inaugural member.

The list encompasses the honours won by Arsenal at national, regional, county and friendly level, records set by the club, their managers and their players. The player records section itemises the club's leading goalscorers and those who have made most appearances in first-team competitions. It also records notable achievements by Arsenal players on the international stage, and the highest transfer fees paid and received by the club. Attendance records at Highbury, the Emirates Stadium, the club's home ground since 2006, and Wembley Stadium, their temporary home for UEFA Champions League games between 1998 and 1999, are also included.

Arsenal have won 13 top-flight titles, and hold the record for the most FA Cup wins, with 14. The club's record appearance maker is David O'Leary, who made 722 appearances between 1975 and 1993. Thierry Henry is Arsenal's record goalscorer, scoring 228 goals in total.

All figures are correct as of 26 December 2020.

Honours and achievements

Arsenal's first ever silverware was won as the Royal Arsenal in 1890. The Kent Junior Cup, won by Royal Arsenal's reserves, was the club's first trophy, while the first team's first trophy came three weeks later when they won the Kent Senior Cup. Their first national major honour came in 1930, when they won the FA Cup. The club enjoyed further success in the 1930s, winning another FA Cup and five Football League First Division titles. Arsenal won their first league and cup double in the 1970–71 season and twice repeated the feat, in 1997–98 and 2001–02, as well as winning a cup double of the FA Cup and League Cup in 1992–93. In 2003–04, Arsenal recorded an unbeaten top-flight league season, something achieved only once before by Preston North End in 1888–89, who only had to play 22 games. To mark the achievement, a special gold version of the Premier League trophy was commissioned and presented to the club the following season. Their most recent success came in 2020, when newcomer Mikel Arteta led the club to a 5–4 victory on penalties over Liverpool to secure their 16th Community Shield title.

Arsenal's honours and achievements include the following:

EFL and Premier League
First Division (until 1992) and Premier League
Winners (13):  1930–31, 1932–33, 1933–34, 1934–35, 1937–38, 1947–48, 1952–53, 1970–71, 1988–89, 1990–91, 1997–98, 2001–02, 2003–04
Runners-up (9): 1925–26, 1931–32, 1972–73, 1998–99, 1999–2000, 2000–01, 2002–03, 2004–05, 2015–16
Second Division (until 1992)
Runners-up (1): 1903–04
EFL Cup
Winners (2):  1986–87, 1992–93
Runners-up (6): 1967–68, 1968–69, 1987–88, 2006–07, 2010–11, 2017–18
League Centenary Trophy
Winners (1):  1988 (record)

The FA
FA Cup
Winners (14):  1929–30, 1935–36, 1949–50, 1970–71, 1978–79, 1992–93, 1997–98, 2001–02, 2002–03, 2004–05, 2013–14, 2014–15, 2016–17, 2019–20 (record)
Runners-up (7): 1926–27, 1931–32, 1951–52, 1971–72, 1977–78, 1979–80, 2000–01
FA Community Shield
Winners (16): 1930, 1931, 1933, 1934, 1938, 1948, 1953, 1991 (shared), 1998, 1999, 2002, 2004, 2014, 2015, 2017, 2020
Runners-up (7): 1935, 1936, 1979, 1989, 1993, 2003, 2005

UEFA
UEFA Champions League
Runners-up (1): 2005–06
UEFA Europa League
Runners-up (2): 1999–2000, 2018–19
UEFA Cup Winners' Cup
Winners (1):  1993–94
Runners-up (2): 1979–80, 1994–95
UEFA Super Cup
Runners-up (1): 1994
Inter-Cities Fairs Cup
Winners (1):  1969–70

Regional honours

County FAs

London FA 
London Senior Cup
Winners (1): 1890–91
Runners-up (1): 1889–90
London Challenge Cup
Winners (11): 1921–22, 1923–24, 1930–31, 1933–34, 1935–36, 1953–54, 1954–55, 1957–58, 1961–62, 1962–63, 1969–70 (record)
Runners-up (6): 1914–15, 1925–26, 1936–37, 1960–61, 1965–66
London Charity Cup
Winners (1): 1889–90

Kent County FA 
Kent Senior Cup
Winners (1): 1889–90

Other

Wartime
London Wartime League
Winners (2): 1941–42, 1942–43 (shared record)
South Regional Wartime League A
Winners (1): 1939–40
Football League War Cup
Runners-up (2): 1940–41, 1942–43
Football League Southern War Cup
Winners (1): 1942–43 (shared record)

Mid-season

Zenith Data Systems British Championship
Winners (2): 1953, 1989 (shared record)
Runners-up (1): 1933
Sheriff of London Charity Shield
Winners (4): 1931, 1933, 1965, 1966 (shared record)
Southern Professional Floodlit Cup
Winners (1): 1958–59 (shared record)
Jean Bernard-Levy Trophy
Winners (2): 1951, 1954 (record)
Will Mather Manor House Hospital Memorial Trophy
Winners (2): 1949, 1950
Mayor of Colchester's Cup
Winners (1): 1939
Bath Coronation Cup
Winners (1): 1937
Footballers' Battalion Charity Fund Match
Winners (1): 1915
London Professional Footballers' Association Charity Fund Match
Winners (5): 1908, 1910, 1911, 1912, 1914 (record)
Runners-up (2): 1909, 1913
Southern Professional Charity Cup
Winners (1): 1905–06
Runners-up (1): 1903–04
Dubai Super Cup
Winners (1): 2022–23

Pre-season

Florida Cup
Winners (1): 2022
Emirates Cup
Winners (6): 2007, 2009, 2010, 2015, 2017, 2022 (record)
Runners-up (2): 2014, 2019
FAW Toyota Cup
Runners-up (1): 2017
Audi Football Summit Shanghai
Winners (1): 2017
Super Match
Winners (2): 2013, 2016
Runners-up (1): 2012
MLS All-Star Game
Winners (1): 2016
Premier League Asia Trophy
Winners (1): 2015
New York Cup
Runners-up (1): 2014
Saitama City Cup
Winners (1): 2013
Indonesia Cup
Winners (1): 2013
Hong Kong Jockey Club Charities Trust Challenge Cup
Winners (1): 2012 (shared)
Malaysia Cup 
Winners (2): 2011, 2012
Markus Liebherr Memorial Cup
Winners (1): 2012
Eusébio Cup
Runners-up (1): 2011
Amsterdam Tournament
Winners (3): 2005, 2007, 2008
Herbert Chapman Memorial Trophy
Winners (1): 2008
Maurice Lacroix Trophy
Winners (1): 2002
Wembley International Tournament
Winners (3): 1988, 1989, 1994 (shared record)
Runners-up (2): 1990, 1991
United Bank International Soccer Festival
Winners (1): 1993
Caltex Cup
Winners (2): 1990, 1991 (record)
Zenith Data Systems Challenge Trophy
Winners (1): 1989
Bielefeld Tournament
Winners (1): 1984
City of Edinburgh Cup
Winners (1): 1941
Norfolk & Norwich Hospital Cup
Winners (2): 1914, 1935
Northampton Hospital Charity Shield
Winners (3): 1930, 1931, 1932
Southend Hospital Cup
Winners (2): 1920–21, 1921–22
Metropolitan Hospital Cup
Winners (1): 1920–21

Player records

Appearances
 Most league appearances: David O'Leary, 558
 Most FA Cup appearances: David O'Leary, 70
 Most League Cup appearances: David O'Leary, 70
 Most European appearances: Thierry Henry, 86
 Youngest first-team player: Ethan Nwaneri, 15 years, 181 days (against Brentford, Premier League, 18 September 2022)
 Oldest first-team player: Jock Rutherford, 41 years 159 days (against Manchester City, First Division, 20 March 1926)
 Most consecutive appearances: Tom Parker, 172 (from 3 April 1926 to 26 December 1929)
 Most separate spells with the club: Hugh McDonald, 3 (1905–06; 1908–10 and 1912–13)

Most appearances
Competitive matches only, includes appearances as substitute. Numbers in brackets indicate goals scored.

a. Includes the Football League and the Premier League.
b. Includes goals and appearances (including those as a substitute) in the FA Charity/Community Shield.

Goalscorers
 Most goals in a season: Ted Drake, 44 goals (in the 1934–35 season)
 Most league goals in a season: Ted Drake, 42 goals in the First Division, 1934–35
 Most goals in a 38-game league season:  Thierry Henry, 30 goals (in the Premier League, 2003–04), Robin van Persie, 30 goals (in the Premier League, 2011–12)
 Most goals in a match: Ted Drake, 7 goals (against Aston Villa, First Division, 14 December 1935)
 Youngest goalscorer: Cesc Fàbregas, 16 years, 212 days (against Wolverhampton Wanderers, League Cup fourth round, 2 December 2003)
 Youngest hat-trick scorer: John Radford, 17 years, 315 days (against Wolverhampton Wanderers, First Division, 2 January 1965)
 Oldest goalscorer: Jock Rutherford, 39 years, 352 days (against Sheffield United, First Division, 20 September 1924)

Top goalscorers
Thierry Henry is the all-time top goalscorer for Arsenal. He passed Ian Wright's eight-year record after scoring twice in a European tie against Sparta Prague in October 2005. Henry was Arsenal's leading goalscorer for seven consecutive seasons, from 1999–2000 to 2005–06.

Competitive matches only. Numbers in brackets indicate appearances made.

{| class="sortable wikitable plainrowheaders"  style="text-align: center;"
|-
! scope="col" style="width:4%;"|Rank
! scope="col" style="width:14%;"|Player
! scope="col" style="width:14%;"|Years
! scope="col" style="width:10%;"|LeagueaGames/Goals
! scope="col" style="width:10%;"|FA CupGames/Goals
! scope="col" style="width:10%;"|League CupGames/Goals
! scope="col" style="width:10%;"|EuropeGames/Goals
! scope="col" style="width:10%;"|OtherbGames/Goals
! scope="col" style="width:10%;"|TotalGames/Goals
|-
|1
! scope="row"| 
| , 2012
| 258 / 175
| 26 / 8
| 3 / 2
| 86 / 42
| 4 / 1
| 377 / 228
|-
|2
! scope="row"| 
| 1991–1998
| 221 / 128
| 16 / 12
| 29 / 29
| 21 / 15
| 1 / 1
| 288 / 185
|-
|3
! scope="row"| 
| 1929–1947
| 350 / 150
| 42 / 26
| 0 / 0
| 0 / 0
| 4 / 2
| 396 / 178
|-
|4
! scope="row"| 
| 1964–1976
| 379 / 111
| 44 / 15
| 34 / 12
| 24 / 11
| 0 / 0
| 481 / 149
|-
|rowspan="2"|5
! scope="row"| 
| 1923–1931
| 204 / 125
| 27 / 14
| 0 / 0
| 0 / 0
| 1 / 0
| 232 / 139
|-
! scope="row"| 
| 1934–1945
| 168 / 124
| 14 / 12
| 0 / 0| 0 / 0| 2 / 3
| 184 / 139
|-
|7
! scope="row"| 
| 1948–1956
|  226 / 125
| 17 / 10
| 0 / 0| 0 / 0| 1 / 2
| 244 / 137
|-
|8
! scope="row"| 
| 2004–2012
| 193 / 96
| 17 / 10
| 12 / 6
| 53 / 20
| 2 / 0| 278 / 132
|-
|9
! scope="row"| 
| 1926–1938
| 333 / 107
| 39 / 17
| 0 / 0| 0 / 0| 2 / 1
| 374 / 125
|-
|10
! scope="row"| 
| 1928–1934
| 181 / 113
| 25 / 10
| 0 / 0| 0 / 0| 2 / 1
| 208 / 124
|}

a. Includes the Football League and the Premier League.
b. Includes goals and appearances (including those as a substitute) in the FA Charity/Community Shield.

International

This section refers only to caps won while an Arsenal player.
 First capped player: Caesar Jenkyns, for Wales against Scotland on 21 March 1896
 First capped player for England: Jimmy Ashcroft, against Ireland on 17 February 1906
 Most capped player: Thierry Henry with 81 caps
 Most capped player for England: Kenny Sansom with 77 caps
 First players to play in the World Cup finals: Dave Bowen and Jack Kelsey, for Wales against Hungary on 8 June 1958
 First players to play in a World Cup for England: Graham Rix and Kenny Sansom against France on 16 June 1982
 Most players from one club in an England starting line-up: 7, against Italy – the so-called "Battle of Highbury" on 14 November 1934
 First player to play in a World Cup final: Emmanuel Petit for France against Brazil on 12 July 1998
 First players to win a World Cup winners' medal: Emmanuel Petit and Patrick Vieira (1998 FIFA World Cup)
 First players to play in a European Championship final: Thierry Henry and Patrick Vieira for France against Italy on 2 July 2000 
 First players to win a European Championship winners' medal: Thierry Henry, Emmanuel Petit and Patrick Vieira (UEFA Euro 2000)
 First player to win a Copa América winners' medal: Edu Gaspar (2004 Copa América)
At 17 years and 75 days, Theo Walcott became the youngest player to earn an England cap, against Hungary on 30 May 2006.

Transfers
For consistency, fees in the record transfer tables below are all sourced from the London Evening Standards contemporary reports of each transfer. Where the report mentions an initial fee potentially rising to a higher figure depending on contractual clauses being satisfied in the future, only the initial fee is listed in the tables.

Record transfer fees paid

Record transfer fees received

 Premier League Hall of Fame 

The following Arsenal players have been inducted into the Premier League Hall of Fame.

Managerial records

 First full-time manager: Thomas Mitchell managed Arsenal from March 1897 to 1898.
 Longest-serving manager: Arsène Wenger –  (1 October 1996 to 13 May 2018)
 Shortest tenure as manager: Pat Rice – 2 weeks, 3 days (13 September 1996 to 30 September 1996)
 Highest win percentage: Pat Rice (caretaker), 75.00%
 Lowest win percentage: Steve Burtenshaw, 27.27%

Club records

Matches

Firsts
 First match: Eastern Wanderers 0–7 Royal Arsenal, friendly, 11 December 1886
 First FA Cup match: Royal Arsenal 11–0 Lyndhurst, first qualifying round, 5 October 1889
 First Football League match: Woolwich Arsenal 2–2 Newcastle United, Second Division, 2 September 1893
 First top-flight match: Newcastle United-3-0-Woolwich Arsenal, 3 November 1904
 First match at Highbury: Woolwich Arsenal 2–1 Leicester Fosse, Second Division, 6 September 1913
 First League Cup match: Arsenal 1–1 Gillingham, second round, 13 September 1966
 First European match: Stævnet (Copenhagen XI) 1–7 Arsenal, Inter-Cities Fairs Cup first round, 25 September 1963
 First home match at Wembley Stadium: Arsenal 2–1 Panathinaikos, UEFA Champions League group stage, 30 September 1998
 First match at the Emirates Stadium: Arsenal 2–1 Ajax, testimonial match for Dennis Bergkamp, 22 July 2006

Record wins
 Record league win: 12–0 against Loughborough, Second Division, 12 March 1900
 Record FA Cup win: 12–0 against Ashford United, first qualifying round, 14 October 1893
 Record League Cup win: 7–0 against Leeds United, second round, 4 September 1979
 Record European win:
 7–0 against Standard Liège, UEFA Cup Winners' Cup second round, 3 November 1993
 7–0 against Slavia Prague, UEFA Champions League group stage, 23 October 2007

Record defeats
 Record league defeat: 0–8 against Loughborough, Second Division, 12 December 1896
 Record FA Cup defeat:
 0–6 against Sunderland, first round, 21 January 1893
 0–6 against Derby County, first round, 28 January 1899
 0–6 against West Ham United, third round, 5 January 1946
 Record League Cup defeat: 0–5 against Chelsea, fourth round, 11 November 1998
 Record European defeat:
 0–4 against Milan, UEFA Champions League round of 16, 15 February 2012
 1–5 against Bayern Munich, UEFA Champions League group stage, 4 November 2015
 1–5 against Bayern Munich, UEFA Champions League Last 16, 15 February 2017
 1–5 against Bayern Munich, UEFA Champions League Last 16, 7 March 2017

Record consecutive results
Arsenal hold several English football records, including the longest unbeaten sequence in the top flight, with 49. Arsenal scored in all 55 league matches from between 19 May 2001 to 30 November 2002 and the club also holds the longest unbeaten away sequence in league football with 27, from 5 April 2003 to 25 September 2004.

 Record consecutive wins: 14, from 12 September 1987 to 11 November 1987
 Record consecutive league wins: 14, from 10 February 2002 to 18 August 2002
 Record consecutive wins coming from behind: 4, from 11 February 2012 to 12 March 2012
 Record consecutive defeats: 8, from 12 February 1977 to 12 March 1977
 Record consecutive league defeats: 7, from 12 February 1977 to 12 March 1977
 Record consecutive draws: 6, from 3 March 1961 to 1 April 1961
 Record consecutive matches without a defeat: 28, from 9 April 2007 to 24 November 2007
 Record consecutive league matches without a defeat: 49, from 7 May 2003 to 16 October 2004
 Record consecutive matches without a win: 19, from 28 September 1912 to 15 January 1913
 Record consecutive league matches without a win: 23, from 28 September 1912 to 1 March 1913
 Record consecutive league games scored in: 55, 19 May 2001-30 November 2002
 Record consecutive away league games without defeat: 27, 5 April 2003-25 September 2004

Goals
 Most league goals scored in a season: 127 in 42 matches, First Division, 1930–31
 Fewest league goals scored in a season: 26 in 38 matches, First Division, 1912–13
 Most league goals conceded in a season: 86 in 42 matches, First Division, 1926–27 and 1927–28
 Fewest league goals conceded in a season: 17 in 38 matches, Premier League, 1998–99

Points
 Most points in a season:
 Two points for a win: 66 in 42 matches, First Division, 1930–31
 Three points for a win: 90 in 38 matches, Premier League, 2003–04
 Fewest points in a season:
 Two points for a win: 18 in 38 matches, First Division, 1912–13
 Three points for a win: 51 in 42 matches, Premier League, 1994–95

Attendances
This section applies to attendances at Highbury, where Arsenal played their home matches from 1913 to 2006, the Emirates Stadium, the club's present home, and Wembley Stadium, which acted as Arsenal's home in the UEFA Champions League during the 1998–99 and 1999–2000 seasons. Arsenal's attendance figures since the move to the Emirates Stadium have been measured by tickets sold.
 Highest attendance at Highbury: 73,295, against Sunderland, First Division, 9 March 1935
 Lowest attendance at Highbury: 4,554, against Leeds United, First Division, 5 May 1966
 Highest attendance at the Emirates Stadium: 60,383 against Wolverhampton Wanderers, Premier League, 2 November 2019
 Lowest attendance at the Emirates Stadium: 25,909, against BATE Borisov, UEFA Europa League group stage, 7 December 2017
 Highest attendance Wembley Stadium: 73,707, against Lens, UEFA Champions League group stage, 25 November 1998
 Lowest attendance at Wembley Stadium: 71,227, against AIK, UEFA Champions League group stage, 22 September 1999

On 17 January 1948, a league-record attendance of 83,260 watched Manchester United play Arsenal at Maine Road. All of the top three attendances in league football occurred at Arsenal games.

European statistics

Arsenal have won two European honours: the Inter-Cities Fairs Cup in 1970 and the Cup Winners' Cup in 1994. They also reached the final of the UEFA Cup in 2000 and the Europa League in 2019, and became the first London team to appear in a UEFA Champions League final in 2006. Despite having never won the UEFA Champions League, Arsenal have set numerous records in the competition. Between the 1998–99 and 2016–17 seasons, they participated in nineteen successive editions, a record only surpassed in Europe by Real Madrid. Goalkeeper Jens Lehmann kept ten consecutive clean sheets in the run-in to Arsenal's first UEFA Champions League final and the defence went 995 minutes until conceding a goal. Arsenal were also the first British side to defeat Real Madrid and Borussia Dortmund away from home, and both Milanese teams: Internazionale and Milan at the San Siro. They were also the first British side to win away to Juventus.

Global records
In August 1928, Arsenal, alongside Chelsea, made history by becoming the first football clubs to wear numbered shirts. A year earlier the first ever live radio commentary of a football match took place, between Arsenal and Sheffield United. Arsenal played in the first match broadcast live on television, against their reserve counterparts in 1937 and have since participated in the world's first live 3D and interactive football matches, both with Manchester United.

Footnotes

ReferencesGeneralSpecific'''

Arsenal
Records
Records